Narlı is a neighborhood of Çatak district in Van Province, Turkey.

Geography 
It is 113 km from Van city and 26 km from Çatak.

Population

References 

Neighbourhoods in Turkey
Populated places in Van Province